The 1919 Coatesville call to arms was when the black community of Coatesville, Pennsylvania formed a large armed group to prevent a rumoured lynching. Only later when the armed group had surrounded the jail to prevent the lynching did they learn that there was no suspect and no white lynch mob.

1911 lynching of Zachariah Walker

In 1911, steelworker Zachariah Walker was lynched in Coatesville; he had left his wife and children in Virginia while seeking better work. This African-American man was accused of killing white mill policeman Edgar Rice, a popular figure in town. Walker claimed self-defense and was hospitalized after his arrest. He was dragged from the hospital and burned to death in front of a mob of hundreds in a field south of the city.  Fifteen men and teenage boys were indicted, but all were acquitted at trials. The lynching was the last in Pennsylvania and is said to have left a permanent stain on the city's image.

Call to arms

On July 6, 1919, a fourteen-year-old white girl, Esther Hughes, was allegedly attacked by a black man. Esther's boy companion was tied to a tree and another girl that was with Esther was able to run away. On July 8, a rumour surfaced that a suspect had been arrested and that a white mob was assembling to lynch him. Scared by the 1911 lynching of Zachariah Walker a large group of Coatesville's African Americans armed themselves and marched downtown to protect the jail from the white mob. When they arrived Mayor Swing and local Rev. T. W. McKinney assured the crowd that the rumor was false. A number of leaders of the march were arrested and charged with inciting a riot even though they had assembled to stop a rumored white riot. All of the nine people arrested were later released.

Aftermath

This uprising was one of several incidents of civil unrest that began in the so-called American Red Summer, of 1919. The Summer consisted of terrorist attacks on black communities, and white oppression in over three dozen cities and counties. In most cases, white mobs attacked African American neighborhoods. In some cases, black community groups resisted the attacks, especially in Chicago and Washington, D.C. Most deaths occurred in rural areas during events like the Elaine Race Riot in Arkansas, where an estimated 100 to 240 black people and 5 white people were killed. Also occurring in 1919 were the Chicago Race Riot and Washington D.C. race riot which killed 38 and 39 people respectively, and with both having many more non-fatal injuries and extensive property damage reaching up into the millions of dollars.

See also
Washington race riot of 1919
Mass racial violence in the United States
List of incidents of civil unrest in the United States

Bibliography 
Notes

References   

 - Total pages: 128

 - Total pages: 332
    
 - Total pages: 930 

1919 in Pennsylvania
1919 in military history
1919 riots in the United States
1919 murders in the United States
July 1919 events
United States Marine Corps in the 20th century
United States Navy in the 20th century
African-American history between emancipation and the civil rights movement
History of racism in Pennsylvania
History of the United States Coast Guard
Racially motivated violence against African Americans
Red Summer
Riots and civil disorder in Pennsylvania
White American riots in the United States
African-American history of Pennsylvania